Silvie Rybářová--Kodešová (born August 25, 1985) is a Czech female open water swimmer who represented the Czech Republic in the world championships. She resides in Brno.

She earned her M.S. and Ph.D. in physical education at the Faculty of Sports Studies of Masaryk University in Brno.

Achievements
She participated in the following World Championships: 2005 Izmir (Turkey), 2007 Bangkok (Thailand), 2009 Belgrade (Serbia), 2011 Shenzhen (China), 2013 Barcelona (Spain), 2015 Kazan (Russia).

1st in the 20km at the Czech Open Water Swimming 2012
9th in the 25km at the 2011 World Swimming Championships

Personal
Husband: Jan Kodeš (June 17, 2017), daughter: Terezka [2017]

References

External links
 Silvie Rybářová website

1985 births
Living people
Czech female swimmers
Female long-distance swimmers
Masaryk University alumni